The 2006 Euroleague Final Four was the concluding Euroleague Final Four tournament of the 2005–06 Euroleague season. The event was held on April 28 and on April 30, 2006 at the O2 Arena in Prague. CSKA Moscow won its fifth EuroLeague championship, after beating Maccabi Tel Aviv in the Final.

Bracket

Semifinals

Third Place game

Final 
Maccabi came to the game looking for their third consecutive title. however, CSKA snatched a narrow 4-point victory to win its fifth title.

Awards

Euroleague Final Four MVP 
  Theo Papaloukas ( CSKA Moscow)

Euroleague Finals Top Scorer 
  Will Solomon ( Maccabi Tel Aviv)

External links 
 2006 Final Four website

Final Four
2005-06
2005–06 in Israeli basketball
2005–06 in Russian basketball
2005–06 in Spanish basketball
2005–06 in Czech basketball
International basketball competitions hosted by the Czech Republic
Sports competitions in Prague
April 2006 sports events in Europe
2000s in Prague